Alexander Leandersson (born 24 June 1997) is a Swedish professional ice hockey player. He is currently playing with BIK Karlskoga of the HockeyAllsvenskan (Allsv).

Playing career 
Leandersson participated in the 2012 TV-pucken, playing for Värmland. He appeared in eight games throughout the tournament and recorded one point. He played the rest of the 2012–13 season in BIK Karlskoga J18 team. He moved to Färjestad BK the following season, where he played in Färjestad BK's J18 team. Leandersson was promoted to the J20 team for the 2014–15 season. The team made it to the playoffs but were defeated in the quarterfinals.  In 2015–16, Leandersson made his SHL debut with Färjestad BK.

Career statistics

References

External links 
 

1997 births
Living people
Bofors IK players
Färjestad BK players
Swedish ice hockey defencemen
HC Vita Hästen players
People from Sundsvall
Sportspeople from Västernorrland County